ARA Bouchard (formerly L'Adroit) is a patrol vessel designed by the French company DCNS for maritime protection missions. She was originally part of the Gowind family of corvettes and patrol vessels but the less military members of the family like Bouchard have been moved into the Kership consortium. The design was self-funded by DCNS without an initial customer, and was initially leased to the French Navy as L'Adroit before being sold to the Argentine Navy in November 2018.  The vessel was commissioned as ARA Bouchard in December 2019.

Design
Bouchard has a 360° panoramic bridge and an integrated mast. The minimal superstructure of the ship leaves a substantial space available for air operations (helicopters, UAVs) and for launch and recovery of surface assets (RHIBs or USVs). Bouchards missions are managed by a combat system, which supplies essential detailed information on the ship’s environment, acquired by various detectors, deployed sensors and other ships integrated into the surveillance network. The mission system can also include a maritime surveillance system capable of detecting suspicious course profiles automatically.

The vessel is capable of a variety of missions usually associated with offshore patrol of economic zones.

History
Placed at the disposal of the French Navy by DCNS for a period of three years, L'Adroit sailed from her home base on France's Mediterranean coast in May 2012 to conduct her first fishery policing and maritime security mission, including deployment for Operation Thon Rouge, monitoring fishing vessels with red tuna quotas for 2012.

Argentine service 
L'Adroit was sold to the Argentine Navy in November 2018, and was commissioned as ARA Bouchard in December 2019. She is home based at Mar del Plata naval base.

See also 
 ARA Piedrabuena (P-52)

References

External links 
 Logbook dedicated to L'Adroit
 L'Adroit at DCNS
 Launching of L'Adroit
 Naval Group reprend possession de L'Adroit

Patrol vessels of the Argentine Navy
Patrol vessels of the French Navy
2011 ships
Ships built in France